George Erwin Klenzendorff (January 23, 1883 – ?) was an architect from Milwaukee, Wisconsin who served one term as a Socialist member of the Wisconsin State Assembly.

Background 
Klenzendorff was born in Rosenberg, West Prussia in the German Empire on January 23, 1883. He attended schools in different parts of the empire up to 1893, when he and his parents emigrated to the United States, coming directly to Milwaukee. After graduating from the Milwaukee Public Schools, he attended a local business college for one year, and studied art three years under what his official biography described as "the direction of Milwaukee's foremost artists." In 1903 he began an apprenticeship in the office of a local architect and continued to follow the architectural profession.

Legislative service 
In 1910, Klenzendorff was elected to the 13th Milwaukee County assembly district (the 13th Ward of the City of Milwaukee) to succeed Republican Charles E. Estabrook, who did not run for re-election. Klenzendorff received 1,123 votes to 906 for Democrat Leander J. Pierson and 805 for Republican Louis H. Jeske. He was assigned to the standing committee on parks, playgrounds and city planning; and to the joint committee on finance.

In 1912, Klenzendorff did not run for re-election, and the seat was reclaimed by Estabrook (now running as a fusion anti-Socialist candidate on the Democratic ticket, even though there was also a Republican nominee).

After the legislature 
Klenzendorff returned to private architectural practice, except for a brief period in 1937–1938 working for the United States Department of Agriculture, and was still in the business as of 1955 (at which time he had been married for 13 years).

References 

1883 births
Architects from Milwaukee
American architects
German emigrants to the United States
Members of the Wisconsin State Assembly
People from West Prussia
Socialist Party of America politicians from Wisconsin
Year of death missing